USNS 1st Lt. Harry L. Martin (T-AK-3015), is the only ship of the  built in 1979. The ship is named after First Lieutenant Harry L. Martin, an American Marine who was awarded the Medal of Honor during World War II.

Construction and commissioning 
The ship was built in 1979 at the Fore River Shipyard, Quincy, Massachusetts.

On 1 August 1986, the Pacific Direct Line owned car carrier MV Lilllooet entered Sydney Harbour. In 1988, the ship was sold to Compagnie Générale Maritime and renamed Rabelais.

In 1993, Norwegian America Line acquired the ship and was renamed NOSAC Cedar until 1994. In 1994, the ship was acquired by the Wilh. Wilhelmsen and renamed Tarago. In 1995, the ship was purchased by the Military Sealift Command and was put into the Prepositioning Program and the Maritime Prepositioning Ship Squadron 3 on 20 April 2000. The ship operates in the Pacific Ocean, out of Saipan and Guam.

On 26 September 2013, the ship collided with the Mathews Bridge, Jacksonville while being towed to North Florida Shipyards at about 2 p.m.  Florida Department of Transportation filed a lawsuit against the towing company after the collision costed $4 million in damage.

On 30 December 2021, Harry L. Martin was removed from service and sold for scrap.

Gallery

References

1st Lt. Harry L. Martin-class dry cargo ship
1979 ships
Ships built in Bremen (state)
Merchant ships of the United States
Bulk carriers of the United States Navy
Container ships of the United States Navy